The Earthsea Cycle, also known as Earthsea, is a series of high fantasy books written by the American writer Ursula K. Le Guin.  Beginning with A Wizard of Earthsea (1968), The Tombs of Atuan, (1970) and The Farthest Shore (1972), the series was continued in Tehanu (1990), and Tales from Earthsea and The Other Wind (both 2001).  In 2018, all the novels and short stories were published in a single volume, The Books of Earthsea: The Complete Illustrated Edition, with artwork by Charles Vess.

Setting 

The world of Earthsea is one of sea and islands: a vast archipelago of hundreds of islands surrounded by mostly uncharted ocean. Earthsea contains no large continents, with the archipelago resembling Indonesia or the Philippines. The cultures of Earthsea are literate non-industrial civilizations and not direct analogues of the real world. Technologically, Earthsea is an early Iron Age society, with bronze used in places where iron is scarce. Weapons also include the use of wood and other hard, easily crafted metals. The overall climate of Earthsea is temperate, comparable to the mid-latitudes (over a distance of about ) of the northern hemisphere of the Earth. There is a yearly transition from warm summers to cold and snowy winters, especially on northern islands like Gont and Osskil. In the southern regions of Earthsea, it can be much warmer.

Most of the people of Earthsea are described as having brown skin.  In the Archipelago "red-brown" skin is typical, while the people of the East Reach have darker "black-brown" complexions. The people of Osskil in the north are described as having lighter, sallow complexions, while the Kargs of the Kargad Lands are "white-skinned" and often "yellow-haired". Le Guin has criticized what she described as the general assumption in fantasy that characters should be white and the society should resemble the Middle Ages.

Magic is a central part of life in most of Earthsea, with the exception of the Kargish lands, where it is banned. There are weather workers on ships, fixers who repair boats and buildings, entertainers, and court sorcerers. Magic is an inborn talent which can be developed with training. The most gifted are sent to the school on Roke, where, if their skill and their discipline prove sufficient, they can become staff-carrying wizards. 

The Dry Land is where most people go after they die, with the exception of the Kargs. It is a realm of shadow and dust, of eternal night where the stars are fixed in the sky, and nothing changes. The souls who reside there have an empty, dreary existence, and even "lovers pass each other in silence". Le Guin has stated that the idea of the Dry Land came from the "Greco-Roman idea of Hades' realm, from certain images in Dante Alighieri's work, and from one of Rainer Maria Rilke's Elegies." In the fifth and last novel of the series, The Other Wind, it is revealed that the Dry Land is a part of the dragons' domain that was stolen from them by the earliest mages in an  attempt gone awry to obtain immortality. The Dry Land is restored to the dragons at the end of The Other Wind.

Series

Books 

Le Guin originally intended for A Wizard of Earthsea to be a standalone novel, but she wrote The Tombs of Atuan as a sequel after considering the loose ends in the first book; The Farthest Shore followed after further consideration. These three books were written in quick succession, from 1968 to 1972, and are sometimes seen as the "original trilogy". Nearly twenty years later, Le Guin wrote a fourth book, Tehanu (1990), and followed it with Tales from Earthsea and The Other Wind in 2001. The latter three books are sometimes referred to as the "second trilogy". The series as a whole is known as the Earthsea Cycle, and was published in a single volume in 2018 as The Books of Earthsea: The Complete Illustrated Edition, with art by Charles Vess.

Short stories 
Le Guin published nine short stories of Earthsea.
Seven appear in two collections of her work (and some have been reissued elsewhere). Two early stories were originally published in 1964, and were collected in The Wind's Twelve Quarters (Harper & Row, 1975). These helped to define the setting of Earthsea. Five much later stories were collected in Tales from Earthsea (Harcourt, 2001), where three were original. In October 2014 a new novella set in Earthsea was published as a stand-alone, "The Daughter of Odren". A final 12-page short story, "Firelight", was published in June 2018, covering the last days of Ged.

Tales from Earthsea also includes about 30 pages of fictional reference material titled "A Description of Earthsea" (2001).

 "The Word of Unbinding", Fantastic Stories of Imagination, January 1964 +Q
 "The Rule of Names", Fantastic Stories of Imagination, April 1964 +Q
 "Dragonfly", Legends: Short Novels by the Masters of Modern Fantasy, Tor Books, 1998 +T
 "Darkrose and Diamond", The Magazine of Fantasy & Science Fiction, Oct-Nov 1999 +T
 "The Bones of the Earth" (2001) T
 "The Finder" (2001) T
 "On The High Marsh" (2001) T
 "The Daughter of Odren" (2014) 
 "Firelight", Paris Review, Summer 2018, issue 225
Notes:
+Q Collected in The Wind's Twelve Quarters
+T Collected in Tales from Earthsea
T   Original to Tales from Earthsea
All of the stories are included in The Books of Earthsea.

Unsubmitted story 
After "The Rule of Names" and before "A Wizard of Earthsea", Le Guin wrote a longish story about a prince in search of the Ultimate. He travels southwest from Havnor through the archipelago into the open sea. He finds a raft-colony and sea-people. The prince joins them in the sea. He wears out, sinks and finds the Ultimate. This story was never submitted for publication for "it never worked out itself well". However, the theme of a raft-colony and sea-people was later taken up as an important ingredient in the plot of The Farthest Shore.

Awards 
Each book in the series has received a literary award:

On November 5, 2019, the BBC News listed The Earthsea Trilogy on its list of the 100 most influential novels.

Adaptations

Audiobooks
There have been a number of audiobook readings by different narrators and publishers. In the early 1990s, Robert Inglis narrated the first three books of the series for Recorded Books.

Radio
A BBC-produced two-hour radio dramatization of A Wizard of Earthsea was originally broadcast on Radio 4 on December 26, 1996. This adaptation was narrated by Dame Judi Dench, with Michael Maloney as Ged, and used a wide range of actors with different regional and social accents to emphasize the origins of the Earthsea characters (for instance, Estarriol and others from the East Reach were played by actors with Southern Welsh accents). The adaptation was subsequently released on audio cassette.

In April and May 2015, BBC Radio 4 aired a new, six-part dramatization of the Earthsea works, encompassing the storylines and motifs of the novels A Wizard of Earthsea, The Tombs of Atuan and The Farthest Shore. The first of the six 30 minute-long episodes premiered on April 27 and the last on May 5. The characters of Ged and Tenar were portrayed by three actors at different stages in their lives (Kasper Hilton-Hille, James McArdle and Shaun Dooley as Ged; Nishi Malde, Aysha Kala and Vineeta Rishi as Tenar). The radio drama was adapted by Judith Adams, directed by Sasha Yevtushenko and featured original music composed by Jon Nicholls. Following the premiere radio broadcast, each of the episodes were made available for online streaming on BBC Radio 4 Extra for a month, via the BBC iPlayer service. The adaptation was created and aired as part of a thematic month centered on the life and works of Ursula Le Guin, in commemoration of her then-recent 85th birthday. In addition to the Earthsea radio drama, the thematic month included the airing of a two-part radio adaptation of The Left Hand of Darkness earlier in April, as well as exclusive interviews with Le Guin and some of the writers she inspired.

Television

Miniseries, 2004

The U.S.-based Sci Fi Channel broadcast in December 2004 a three-hour loose adaptation for television of A Wizard of Earthsea and The Tombs of Atuan, entitled Legend of Earthsea (later, simply Earthsea). It was broadcast in two parts on Channel 4 in the UK at Easter 2005. Sci Fi Channel had angered Le Guin and fans of the Earthsea novels with its announcement that Ged and the vast majority of the other characters would be played by Caucasians and with the dramatis personæ posted on an official website. The latter revealed several original characters – such as "The Archmagus" and "King Tygath", "Diana", "Penelope", and "Marion" – and it referred to "Kargide" characters rather than Kargad, Karg, or Kargish. The religious practices of Atuan were portrayed differently in the adaptation, and the celibacy of Earthsea wizards overlooked as Ged and Tenar become sexually involved.

One month before the U.S. broadcast, Le Guin posted on her website "A Reply to Some Statements Made by the Film-Makers" published in the December 2004 issue of Sci Fi Magazine. She opened with the observation, "I've tried very hard to keep from saying anything at all about this production, being well aware that movies must differ in many ways from the books they're based on, and feeling that I really had no business talking about it, since I was not included in planning it and was given no part in discussions or decisions." (Director Robert Lieberman, too, had stated that she was not involved.)

"That makes it particularly galling of the director to put words in my mouth." Le Guin disavowed some specific interpretations both by Lieberman and by executive director Robert Halmi Sr., and concluded (quoting Lieberman):

I wonder if the people who made the film of The Lord of the Rings had ended it with Frodo putting on the Ring and ruling happily ever after, and then claimed that that was what Tolkien "intended ..."[,] would people think they'd been "very, very honest to the books"?

Planned TV series
In May 2018, it was announced that the series had been opted for a film adaptation by producer Jennifer Fox. In 2019 it was decided to produce a TV series instead.

As of September 2022, nothing has been heard of this proposed series in three years.

Animated film, 2006

Studio Ghibli's 2006 film, Tales from Earthsea, is loosely based in the Earthsea mythology. It was directed by Gorō Miyazaki, the son of Hayao Miyazaki. Le Guin granted Studio Ghibli the rights due to her love of Hayao Miyazaki's films. Le Guin called the adaptation "disappointing" and "entirely different" from her creation.

Explanatory notes

References

Citations

General and cited references

External links 
 Le Guin's homepage – her own map of Earthsea, truncated
 
 The World of Earthsea – with Le Guin's own map and published illustrations including maps
 "Ursula Le Guin's Magical World of Earthsea" by Jan M. Griffin, The ALAN Review 23.2 (Spring 1996)
 The Isolate Tower: An Earthsea Compendium – fan encyclopedia or companion book
 "To Light A Candle: An Unofficial Earthsea Companion" – fan encyclopedia or companion book

 
Book series introduced in 1968
Books illustrated by Anne Yvonne Gilbert
Books illustrated by Ruth Robbins
Fantasy novel series
Fiction set on ocean planets
Fictional terrestrial planets
High fantasy novels
Mass media franchises introduced in 1964
Series by Ursula K. Le Guin